Check Point is an American-Israeli multinational provider of software and combined hardware and software products for IT security, including network security, endpoint security, cloud security, mobile security, data security and security management.

, the company has approximately 6,000 employees worldwide. Headquartered in Tel Aviv, Israel and San Carlos, California, the company has development centers in Israel and Belarus and previously held in United States (ZoneAlarm), Sweden (former Protect Data development centre) following acquisitions of companies who owned these centers. The company has offices in over 70 locations worldwide including main offices in North America, 10 in the United States (including in San Carlos, California and Dallas, Texas), 4 in Canada (including Ottawa, Ontario) as well as in Europe (London, Paris, Munich, Madrid) and in Asia Pacific (Singapore, Japan, Bengaluru, Sydney) .

History
Check Point was established in Ramat Gan, Israel in 1993, by Gil Shwed (CEO ), Marius Nacht (Chairman ) and Shlomo Kramer (who left Check Point in 2003). Shwed had the initial idea for the company's core technology known as stateful inspection, which became the foundation for the company's first product, FireWall-1; soon afterwards they also developed one of the world's first VPN products, VPN-1. Shwed developed the idea while serving in the Unit 8200 of the Israel Defense Forces, where he worked on securing classified networks.

Initial funding of US$250,000 was provided by venture capital fund BRM Group.

In 1994 Check Point signed an OEM agreement with Sun Microsystems, followed by a distribution agreement with HP in 1995. The same year, the U.S. head office was established in Redwood City, California.

By February 1996, the company was named worldwide firewall market leader by IDC, with a market share of 40 percent.
In June 1996 Check Point raised $67 million from its initial public offering on NASDAQ.

In 1998, Check Point established a partnership with Nokia, which bundled Check Point's Software with Nokia's computer Network Security Appliances.

In 2003, a class-action lawsuit was filed against Check Point over violation of the Securities Exchange Act by failing to disclose major financial information.

On 14 August 2003 Check Point opened its branch in India's capital, Delhi (with the legal name Check Point Software Technologies India Pvt. Ltd.). Eyal Desheh was the first director appointed in India.

During the first decade of the 21st century Check Point started acquiring other IT security companies, including Nokia's network security business unit in 2009.

In 2019, researchers at Check Point found a security breach in Xiaomi phone apps. The security flaw was reported preinstalled.

Check Point is presently focused on what it calls "fifth generation cyber security," or “Gen V.” It identifies the fifth generation as focused on large-scale and fast moving attacks across mobile, cloud and on-premise networks that easily bypass the conventional, static detection-based defenses being used by most organizations today.

Over the years many employees who worked at Check Point have left to start their own software companies. These include Shlomo Kremer, who started Imperva; Nir Zuk, who founded Palo Alto Networks; Ruvi Kitov and Reuven Harrison of Tufin; Yonadav Leitersdorf, who founded Indeni; and Avi Shua, who founded Orca Security;

On 23 July 2020, Aryaka confirmed an alliance with Check Point Software Technologies to optimize the SD-WAN system operated by Aryaka Cloud-First, and Check Point CloudGuard Link and CloudGuard Edge to provide optimized protection and SD-WAN as-a-Service.

Products
Check Point offers the following primary products:

 Network Security
 Software Defined Protection
 Public and Private Cloud Security
 Zero Trust Remote Access
 Data Security
 IoT Security
 ThreatCloud
 ThreatCloud IntelliStore
 Virtual Systems
 Endpoint Security
 Mobile Security
 Security Management
 Document Security (Capsule Docs product line)
 Zero-day Protection (SandBlast appliance product line)
 Mobile Security (Mobile Threat Prevention product line)

Acquisitions

 Zone Labs, makers of the ZoneAlarm personal firewall software, in 2003, for $205 million in cash and shares.
 Protect Data, the holding company for PointSec Mobile Technologies, in a cash deal valued at $586m in late 2006. Prior to their acquisition by Check Point, Protect Data acquired Reflex Software.
 NFR security, an intrusion prevention system developer, for $20 million in late 2006, following its failed plan to acquire the larger IPS vendor Sourcefire.
 Nokia Security Appliances division was acquired in April 2009.
 Liquid Machines, a data security startup company based in Boston, was acquired in June 2010.
 Dynasec, a provider of enterprise governance, risk management, and compliance products, was acquired  in November 2011. Dynasec offers a Web-based enterprise application, branded as Easy2comply, for Sarbanes-Oxley compliance, Basel II compliance, operational risk management, information security management, HIPAA compliance, and internal audit management.
 Hyperwise, an early-stage startup focused on CPU level threat prevention, was acquired Feb 2015.
 Lacoon Mobile Security was acquired in April 2015.
 Dome9 was acquired in October 2018.
 ForceNock was acquired in January 2019
 Cymplify was acquired in Dec. 2019 
 Protego Labs was acquired in Dec. 2019
 Odo Security was acquired in Sep. 2020
 Avanan was acquired in August 2021
 Spectral was acquired in February 2022

In 2005, Check Point tried to acquire intrusion prevention system developers Sourcefire for $225 million, but later withdrew its offer after it became clear US authorities (specifically, the Committee on Foreign Investment in the United States
) would try to block the acquisition.

SofaWare legal battle
SofaWare Technologies was founded in 1999, as a cooperation between Check Point and SofaWare's founders, Adi Ruppin and Etay Bogner, with the purpose of extending Check Point from the enterprise market to the small business, consumer and branch office market. SofaWare's co-founder Adi Ruppin said that his company wanted to make the technology simple to use and affordable, and to lift the burden of security management from end users while adding some features. In 2001 SofaWare began selling firewall appliances under the SofaWare S-Box brand; in 2002 the company started selling the Safe@Office and Safe@Home line of security appliances, under the Check Point brand. By the fourth quarter of 2002 sales of SofaWare's Safe@Office firewall/VPN appliances had increased greatly, and SofaWare held the #1 revenue position in the worldwide firewall/VPN sub-$490 appliance market, with a 38% revenue market share.

Relations between Check Point and the SofaWare founders went sour after the company acquisition in 2002. In 2004 Etay Bogner, co-founder of SofaWare, sought court approval to file a shareholder derivative suit, claiming Check Point was not transferring funds to SofaWare as required for its use of SofaWare's products and technology. His derivative suit was ultimately successful, and Check Point was ordered to pay SofaWare 13 million shekels for breach of contract.
In 2006 the Tel Aviv District Court Judge ruled that Bogner SofaWare could sue Check Point by proxy for $5.1 million in alleged damage to SofaWare. Bogner claimed that Check Point, which owned 60% of Sofaware, had behaved belligerently, and withheld monies due for use of SofaWare technology and products Check Point appealed the ruling, but lost.

In 2009 the Israeli Supreme Court ruled that a group of founders of SofaWare, which includes Bogner, had veto power over any decision of SofaWare. The court ruled that the three founders could exercise their veto power only as a group and by majority rule.

In 2011 Check Point settled all litigation relating to SofaWare. As part of the settlement it acquired the SofaWare shares held by Bogner and Ruppin, and began a process of acquiring the remaining shares, resulting in SofaWare becoming a wholly owned subsidiary.

See also

 Check Point GO
 Economy of Israel
 Silicon Wadi

References

External links
 Corporate website
 Check Point Research

Computer security companies
Computer security software companies
Software companies established in 1993
Israeli brands
Networking hardware companies
Software companies of Israel
Deep packet inspection
Server appliance
Companies based in San Carlos, California
Software companies of the United States
Companies based in Tel Aviv
Companies listed on the Nasdaq
1993 establishments in Israel
1996 initial public offerings